Marshalltown High School (MHS) is public high school located in Marshalltown, Iowa and is home to 1,600 students in grades 9–12. It is a part of the Marshalltown Community School District.

The district, and therefore the high school, serves almost all of Marshalltown, Albion, and Haverhill.

History
The first Marshalltown High School was located north of downtown Marshalltown on Grant Street before moving to the present Miller Middle School. In 1965, the present Marshalltown High School building opened and has experienced minor additions including a library, weightroom, auditorium and classroom wings.

The Marshalltown High School athletics facilities include both outdoor and indoor sports accommodations.  The outdoor facilities include baseball, football, soccer and softball fields, as well as a track. The indoor facilities include a swimming pool, and a gymnasium, known as the "Roundhouse", which has accommodations for basketball, volleyball, wrestling, and track. All areas are served by concessions, restrooms, parking and men's and women's locker rooms.

The Roundhouse was renovated in 2015 to include additional sports locker rooms and the wooden bleachers were replaced with ADA-approved plastic bleachers.  The MHS swimming pool area was also renovated to include windows to be able to view from the hallway and additional pool deck space.

The Marshalltown Court Complex, consisting of twelve tennis courts and three pickleball courts, was completed in October 2020 and is used by the Boys and Girls Tennis teams.

Activities
Students at Marshalltown High School have a wide array of co-curricular and extra-curricular activities to choose from, including athletics, National Honor Society, Key Club, music, speech, drama, foreign language clubs, color guard and cheer.

Athletics
Marshalltown High School sports teams are known as the Bobcats; their uniforms display the school's colors of blue and red.

The school fields athletic teams in 21 sports including:

 Summer: Baseball and softball
Baseball (1964 Baseball State Champions)
 Fall: Football, volleyball, girls' swimming and diving, girls' cross country
Boys' cross country (6-time State Champions - 1976, 1979, 1981, 1982, 1984, 1986)
Boys' golf (5-time State Champions - 1958, 1959, 1960, 1979, 1980)
Volleyball (1994 State Champions)
 Winter: Boys' swimming, boys' bowling, girls' bowling
Boys' basketball (4-time State Champions - 1956, 1960, 1961, 1966)
Girls' basketball (1986 State Champions)
Wrestling (3-time State Champions - 1924, 1925, 1926)
 Spring: Girls' track and field, boys' soccer, girls' soccer, boys' tennis, girls' tennis
Boys' track and field (1985 State Champions)
Girls' golf (4-time State Champions - 1994, 1995, 1996, 2005)

Notable alumni
 Cap Anson, Hall of Fame MLB player, played for the school in 1869.
George C. Armstrong, Illinois state senator, newspaper editor, and businessman
 Jeff Clement,  is a retired MLB player for the Pittsburgh Pirates. He formerly played for the Seattle Mariners. He played both 1st base and catcher, however he enjoyed little success at the professional level. 
 Ina May Gaskin, the only midwife for whom an obstetric maneuver is named, graduated from Marshalltown High School in 1958.
 Rick Glenn, professional Mixed Martial Artist, current UFC Featherweight
 John Hurlburt (1898-1968), NFL player
 African American educational innovator Laurence C. Jones graduated in 1903.
 Eagle Scout Darwin Judge, 1974 graduate of Marshalltown High School & United States Marine Corps MSG was KIA April 29, 1975 being one of the last two Americans killed in Vietnam.
 Joseph Kosinski, the  American television commercial and feature film director, best known for his computer graphics and computer generated imagery work. graduated from Marshalltown High School in 1992.  Mr. Kosinski made his big-screen directorial debut with the Disney Digital 3-D science fiction film Tron: Legacy in December 2010.
 Coach Adolph Rupp began his coaching career with the Marshalltown wrestling team, leading them to a state championship during the 1925–26 school year.
 Jean Seberg (1938 – 1979), actress who starred in 34 films in Hollywood and in Europe, including Saint Joan, Bonjour Tristesse, Breathless, Lilith, Moment to Moment, A Fine Madness, Paint Your Wagon, Airport, Macho Callahan, and Gang War in Naples.
Modern Life is War, hardcore punk band

See also
List of high schools in Iowa

References

External links
 
 Marshalltown Community School District website
 Marshalttown School Board website
 Marshalltown Bobcats Athletics website
 Marshalltown Bobcats Bands website
 Marshalltown Senior High School Class Reunions website

Public high schools in Iowa
Schools in Marshall County, Iowa
Buildings and structures in Marshalltown, Iowa
Iowa High School Athletic Association
1965 establishments in Iowa